Bumtsibum (former BumtsiBum!) is a Finnish weekly television game show based on the Irish The Lyrics Board and starred by Marco Bjurström. At the show's peak viewership, it was watched by 1.4 million people. In October 2016, it was announced that the show will return in March 2017, with Kalle Lindroth replacing Bjurström as the host.

References

External links

Finnish game shows
1997 Finnish television series debuts
2005 Finnish television series endings
1990s Finnish television series
2000s Finnish television series
2010s Finnish television series
MTV3 original programming
1990s game shows
2000s game shows
2010s game shows